Sérgio Ricardo Messias Neves (born 22 May 1974), also known as Sérgio Ricardo or Serginho,  is a Brazilian professional footballer who played as a forward. He played for Fenerbahçe and Sakaryaspor in Turkey, Al-Ittihad, Al-Ahli and Al-Sadd in Qatar, Al-Hilal in Saudi Arabia, and Al Ain and Al Nasr in United Arab Emirates.

Career
Sérgio Ricardo transferred to Turkish club Fenerbahçe in 1998–99 season start and then loaned to Sakaryaspor in January transfer window. 1999–00 season start he was loaned again to Al-Ittihad in Saudi Arabia. He won the Arab Cup Winners' Cup with the club. He returned to Fenerbahçe but was loaned again to a few Qatari clubs.

He was the top goal scorer of the 2003–04 Saudi Premier league with 15 goals.

Club Carrer Stats

Personal life
Sérgio Ricardo performed Umrah after becoming a Muslim.

References

External links

1974 births
Living people
Association football forwards
Brazilian Muslims
Converts to Islam
Brazilian footballers
Brazilian expatriate footballers
Brazilian expatriate sportspeople in Turkey
Brazilian expatriate sportspeople in Qatar
Expatriate footballers in Qatar
Expatriate footballers in Turkey
Expatriate footballers in Saudi Arabia
Al Ain FC players
Al Hilal SFC players
Al-Ahli Saudi FC players
Ittihad FC players
Fenerbahçe S.K. footballers
Sakaryaspor footballers
Al Sadd SC players
Al Ahli SC (Doha) players
Al-Gharafa SC players
Al-Raed FC players
Qatar Stars League players
Saudi Professional League players
Sportspeople from Salvador, Bahia